Spirit of the Game is a 2016 biographical film written and directed by Darran Scott aka Darran Page with cinematography by Brian J. Breheny (The Adventures of Priscilla, Queen of the Desert). The film is based on the true story of the Mormon Yankees, an American basketball team which played in exhibition games before the 1956 Summer Olympics. The film stars, Aaron Jakubenko, Kevin Sorbo, Wade Briggs, Grant Pino and Anna McGahan.

Plot 
It’s 1956 and 20 year old Delyle Condie travels to Melbourne, Australia, on a Mission for his Church in an attempt to recover from a broken heart. He leaves behind a promising basketball career and finds himself in a city gripped with Olympic fever. Delyle struggles to maintain his spirits when faced with the indifference of the locals, but when an opportunity to help train Australia’s first Olympic basketball team arises, Delyle sees his chance to connect. His passion leads to the formation of the Mormon Yankees basketball team, and in the run up to the Games, fierce competition with the French leads to a bloody rematch, through which Delyle and his Yankees are able to prove their faith - and their mettle - to the world.

Cast 
 Aaron Jakubenko as DeLyle Condie
 Kevin Sorbo as Parley Condie
 Wade Briggs as Don Hull
 Grant Piro as Ken Watson
 Anna McGahan as Elspeth
 Heidi Arena as Mary Condie
 Mark Mitchell as President Bingham
 Alex Cooke as Elder Garn
 Brenton Cosier as Elder Kimball
 Andrew Hearle as Elder Frodsham
 Rudi Baker as Stan Page
 Cameron Caulfield as Brett
 Emilie Cocquerel as Emily
 Hanna MacDonald as herself

Reception 

The Deseret News criticised the "stiff acting" in the movie, but highlighted Piro's performance and described the story as "compelling". The Salt Lake Tribune thought the film was full of "ponderous piety" but praised Sorbo for adding some gravitas to his role.
The film was nominated for best dramatic cinema in the 2017 Sundance Film Festival.

References

External links
 
 

2016 films
2010s sports films
Basketball films
Films set in 1956
Films set in Australia
Australian sports drama films
2010s English-language films